Turn to Dust may refer to:

 "Turn to Dust", a 1996 song by Def Leppard from the album Slang
 "Turn to Dust", a 2003 song by Crash from the album The Massive Crush
 "Turn to Dust", a 2006 song by Freestylers from the album Adventures in Freestyle
 "Turn to Dust", a 2015 song by Wolf Alice from the album My Love Is Cool
 "Turn to Dust", a 2017 song by Europe from the album Walk the Earth
 "Turn to Dust", a 2017 song by Kelela from the album Take Me Apart
 "Turned to Dust", a 2015 song by the Sword from the album High Country